Olga Petrovna Bondarenko (née Krentser, ; born 2 June 1960 in Slavgorod) is a retired Russian female track and field athlete, who competed mainly in the 10,000 metres. She trained at the Armed Forces sports society in Volgograd and represented the Soviet Union internationally.

She competed for the Soviet Union at the 1988 Summer Olympics held in Seoul, South Korea where she won the gold medal in the first Olympic women's 10,000 metres event, setting a new Olympic record: 31:05.21.

International competitions

See also
List of Olympic medalists in athletics (women)
List of 1988 Summer Olympics medal winners
List of IAAF World Indoor Championships medalists (women)
List of European Athletics Championships medalists (women)
List of European Athletics Indoor Championships medalists (women)
List of Russian sportspeople

References

External links
 Biography

1960 births
Living people
People from Slavgorod
Sportspeople from Altai Krai
Soviet female long-distance runners
Russian female long-distance runners
Soviet female cross country runners
Russian female cross country runners
Olympic female long-distance runners
Olympic athletes of the Soviet Union
Olympic gold medalists for the Soviet Union
Olympic gold medalists in athletics (track and field)
Athletes (track and field) at the 1988 Summer Olympics
Athletes (track and field) at the 1992 Summer Olympics
Medalists at the 1988 Summer Olympics
Goodwill Games medalists in athletics
Competitors at the 1986 Goodwill Games
World Athletics Indoor Championships medalists
European Athletics Championships winners
European Athletics Championships medalists
Russian Athletics Championships winners
Friendship Games medalists in athletics